Elise Estrada (born July 30, 1987) is a Filipino-Canadian pop singer-songwriter. She is known for her hit singles such as "Insatiable", "One Last Time" and "Lipstick" which were released in Canada.

She is signed to Universal Music Canada's XOXO Entertainment.

Early life and career beginnings 
Elise Estrada was born in the Philippines and moved to Canada when she was four. She has a younger sister, Emmalyn Estrada and two brothers, Ervin and Eric.

While growing up in Surrey, British Columbia, she attended Holy Cross Regional High School and participated in many pageant and singing competitions. At age 17, Estrada won the title of "Miss Vancouver Princess" and later became the first runner-up in the Binibining Pilipinas World of Canada Competition.

Career
In 2006, Estrada was a finalist in the Philippine television vocal competition, Pinoy Pop Superstar. In 2007, she won the 2007 Beat Music Awards and earned a record and management contract with RockSTAR Music Corporation. Her debut single, "Insatiable", was released in May 2007 and went to No. 1 on the Canadian Top 40 Charts. In 2008 and 2009 and also in July 2011, Estrada performed at the Canada Day Festival in Surrey, B.C.

In August 2009, Estrada's Canadian television series, Love Court debuted on MuchMusic which featured her song "First Degree" as its theme. "Love Court" was played many times each week and was later seen on MuchMoreMusic.

Estrada has toured with George, Girlicious, Soulja Boy Tell 'Em, Rihanna, Lady Gaga, Backstreet Boys, 50 Cent, Nelly, and Sean Kingston.

Estrada appeared in a Sony Films movie with David Hasselhoff and Lucas Grabeel (High School Musical, Milk).

My Date with...Elise Estrada in Thailand aired on MuchMusic on September 8, 2010.

Here Kitty Kittee, Estrada's second album was scheduled to be released on November 9, 2010, on iTunes Canada according to her Entertainment Tonight Canada interview. The album's first single "You're So Hollywood" was released on July 9, 2010, and the music video was premiered at Muchmusic New Music Videos on September 23, 2010. Her second single, "Lipstick", previewed on her Myspace page. The music video for the song was filmed in London and was finalized and premiered on Estrada's Vevo Channel on December 1, 2010.  Estrada starred and sang as a guest on CW Network's Hellcats episode "God Must Have My Fortune Laid Away" on February 15, 2011. She sang a new song called "I Be That".

Estrada began working on her third studio album titled #Round 3 in 2012. On October 2, 2012, the single "Piece of Me", a dance-pop/bubblegum pop track, was released. It was followed by a single on October 23 titled "Wonder Woman", which was dedicated to Amanda Todd who committed suicide from cyber-bullying. On January 7, 2014, she released the album's lead single, "U Don't Need 2 Know". Its music video premiered on VEVO on the same day. #Round 3 was eventually released on July 29, 2014. She also signed a record deal with VIVA Records to release the album in Asia and handle her promotions in the Philippines during her concert tours from August to September.

Personal life 
In December 2019, Estrada was engaged to boyfriend of ten years, Adam Hurstfield. Estrada announced that she was pregnant with her first child in 2020.

Discography

Studio albums

EPs

Singles

Awards, nominations and achievements

Highlights
	Ten Top 10 Cancon singles & two No. 1 Cancon singles to date!
	2009 Juno Award nomination for Best R&B/Soul Recording of the Year
	Two 2009 Much Music Video Award nominations for Best Pop Video of the Year & Cinematographer of the Year
	Presenter at the 2009 Juno Awards on CTV
	Performance at the 2009 Juno Awards Gala
	Starring in the hit MuchMusic Television series "Love Court"

Wins and nominations
	Winner – BDS 20,000 Spins Award for "UnLove You" – November 2008
	Winner – "The Best New Artist or Group Award" at 'The 2008 Canadian Radio Music Awards' (nominated for 2 awards)
	Winner – "The Factor Emerging Artist Initiative"
	Winner – "The Chum emerging artist initiative" from one of Canada's largest radio conglomerates!
	Winner – The Beat 94.5 Radio Contest as the "2007 Artist of the Year" at ‘The Beat Music Awards’!
	Winner – The Canadian Finals for the American Idol like television series, "Pinoy Pop Superstar"… went on to the Philippine's to co-star in the television series for 3 months and gained Millions of Asian fans in Canada and Worldwide
	Nominated for "Best R&B/Soul Recording of the Year" at The 2009 Juno Awards (Canada's Grammy's)
	Nomination for two Much Music Video Awards 2009

Musical highlights
	Debut single "Insatiable" became the No. 1 Canadian single on both the BDS and MediaBase TOP 40 Charts for 4 weeks straight
	Hit the No. 1 Canadian Greatest Gainer @ Top 40 numerous times to date
	3rd single, "UnLove You" hit No. 1 on The Top 40 Charts (making it her 2nd No. 1 single to date)

Tour highlights
	Headlined Juno Fanfare 2009 with Warner Music recording artist Divine Brown
	Direct tour support slot for Backstreet Boys
	Summer Tour ’08 with 50 Cent, G Unit, & Soulja Boy
	Direct tour support for Sean Kingston
	Co-Headlined Summer ’08 tour dates with Nelly, and guest performances by Jesse McCartney, Lady Gaga, Cascada, Girlicious, C&C Music Factory, and Snap!
	Opened for hit recording artists Summer ’07 tours including Rihanna and Enrique Iglesias

Sponsors
 Marketing & promotion sponsorship with Parasuco Clothing
 Marketing & promotion sponsorship with National clothing chain ‘Urban Planet’
 National promotion with Clarins Cosmetics & Access Magazine to launch their new Roxy Fragrance

Juno Awards

|-
| 2009 || Elise Estrada || R&B/Soul Recording of the Year ||

Canadian Radio Music Awards

|-
| rowspan=2|2008 || Elise Estrada || Best New Artist or Group – Pop/Rock || 
|-
| Elise Estrada || Best New Artist or Group – Rhythmic/Urban/R&B/Dance ||

References

External links

 
 
 Elise Estrada at YouTube
 justalilhype! Vancouver HYPE Magazine interview with Elise Estrada

1987 births
Canadian dance musicians
Canadian musicians of Filipino descent
Filipino emigrants to Canada
Naturalized citizens of Canada
Living people
Musicians from British Columbia
People from Surrey, British Columbia
People from Marikina
Participants in Philippine reality television series
Universal Records artists
Canadian women pop singers
21st-century Canadian women singers